Anne-Marcelle Kahn, née Schrameck (4 June 1896 – 28 June 1965) was the first French woman engineer to graduate from l'École nationale supérieure des mines de Saint-Étienne (the National School of Mines of Saint-Étienne), in 1919. She later married Louis Kahn, who became the first Jewish French Admiral, and crossed the Pyrenees alone with her two young children to reach safety during the Second World War.

Early life 
Anne-Marcelle Schrameck was born on 4 June 1896 in the 7th arrondissement of Paris. She was the daughter of Marguerite Odile Bernheim (1872–1945) and Abraham Schrameck, who was a French Minister of the Interior in the Third Republic. The family were Jewish.

Education 
In 1912, Schrameck entered a lyceum. In 1919, Anne-Marcelle Schrameck became the first woman engineering graduate from a major school. Studying at l'École nationale supérieure des mines de Saint-Étienne between 1917 and 1919, she earned the diplôme d’ingénieur civil des mines (diploma of civil engineer of mines).

Following her admission, there was significant debate over the suitability of a woman taking the course as pupils had to undertake an internship as a miner, considered inappropriate for a woman. The school's regulations were subsequently amended to prohibit the admission of women, a situation which lasted for 50 years (until 1968), and during that time no other woman was admitted as an engineering student in a French mining school.

Career 
In 1920, Anne-Marcelle Schrameck worked for a time in the Kuhlmann chemical factories in Lorraine.

Marriage to Louis Kahn 
On 11 July 1922, Anne-Marcelle Schrameck married Louis Kahn, a marine engineer, at the Synagogue de la Victoire in Paris. The couple lived in Brest, then Saïgon then Lorient and had two sons, Pierre (1926–1997) and Jean (1931–2017). Between 1927 and 1929 she was a member of Shakespeare and Company, an English language bookshop in Paris run by Sylvia Beach.

Second World War 
In July 1940 her father, Abraham Schrameck, voted in parliament in favour of giving full powers to Marshal Pétain at the start of the Vichy Republic but despite this support he was stripped of his senatorial position by Pétain on 27 November 1941 and was soon arrested and interned because of his Jewish origins. Managing to reach Provence, he remained hidden there until the Libération.

On 15 August 1941 Louis Kahn was sacked from the Navy following the introduction of antisemitic laws preventing Jews holding state offices.

The family fled separately to escape any further reprisals. After two escape attempts, Louis Kahn managed to reach London alone. He joined the Free French Naval Forces (FNFL) with the rank of chief engineer. With the Minister of the Navy Louis Jacquinot and Vice-Admiral André Lemonnier, he became one of the leaders of the renewal of the Free French Naval Forces based in Algiers, following its conquest by Allied forces following Operation Torch in November 1942. He held the post of director of naval constructions from 1943.

Marseille 
Anne-Marcelle Kahn left for the relative safety of Marseille in the French-administered Zone Libre with her two young sons, Pierre and Jean, and her father on 18 June 1940. In November 1942, the Germans invaded the free zone. On 24 December 1942, a bomb was placed in one of the large hotels in Marseille. The wife of the German consul lost both legs in the explosion, and died a few days later. The reprisals began with arrests and deportations.

Marseille had become a dangerous place as the Germans destroyed the district of the Old Port of Marseille, and instituted the Marseille roundup (22 – 24 January 1943) in collaboration with the French police of the Vichy government, directed by René Bousquet. The police checked the identity documents of 40,000 people and arrested and deported over 2000 Jewish people.

Anne-Marcelle Kahn decided to leave Marseille when a 16-year-old friend of her son was arrested and deported by the Germans. She and the children often slept in friends' houses for safety whilst she tried to get papers in another name to protect them. The Resistance took her in, gave her good accommodation, and fed her for eight days whilst new identity cards were created for her and the children.

Grenoble 
She and her sons travelled into the Alps, near Grenoble, and the children stayed in a boarding house for safety. The Resistance provided her with false identity cards.

Anne-Marcelle Kahn received a message from her husband, Je suis arrivé (I have arrived) but the message from England took a long time to reach her. Kahn had sent it in the expectation that the family would join him in Britain.

Crossing the Pyrenees 
Anne-Marcelle Kahn looked for the guides who had helpd her husband across the Pyrenees, so that they could escape from France, but they had mosty been arrested. When she found other smugglers, they were not willing to guide young children across the Pyrenees as they thought her youngest son Jean, at only 10 years old, would not be able to make it. The elder son was Pierre, was 15.

She decided to make the journey with her two children, unaided, in October 1943, using a Scouting compass and Carte d'état-major general maps of France.

The family crossed the Pyrenees from Perpignan alone in two days. They took nothing with them, hoping to pass themselves off as tourists. They took nine days to travel from Perpignan to finally reach Casablanca, in Morocco, including spending three days in prison in Spain after being arrested in Barcelona.

Casablanca, then Algiers 
Anne-Marcelle Kahn and her two sons arrived in Casablanca on 22 October 1943, having learned that Louis Kahn was alive and in Algiers from a man they met on the ship, having had no news for eight months. They moved on to join him in Algiers, and then left on 17 October 1944, to return to Paris, where the family settled.

She later recounted her experiences and journeys during the Second World War in an interview with David P. Boder in 1946.

Death 
Anne-Marcelle Kahn died on 28 June 1965, in the 14th arrondissement of Paris, at the age of 69.

References 

1896 births
1965 deaths
20th-century French engineers
20th-century French women
20th-century women engineers
Engineers from Paris
French civil engineers
French mining engineers
French women engineers
Holocaust survivors
Jewish engineers